Luis Goytisolo Gay (born 17 March 1935) is a Spanish Catalan writer in the Spanish language. He is best known for his tetralogy Antagony, which was published between 1973 and 1981. Goytisolo is a member of the Real Academia Española.

Career
Goytisolo was born on 17 March 1935 in Barcelona. He is the younger brother to José Agustín Goytisolo and Juan Goytisolo. He started studying law in 1953 but quit shortly afterwards to dedicate himself to literature and a political struggle against Francoist Spain.

In 1963 he was locked up for four months in the Carabanchel Prison for being a supporter of the Unified Socialist Party of Catalonia/Communist Party of Spain. Part of this period he spent in isolation. During his time in prison he started to write his novel Antagony. He wrote on used pieces of toilet paper.

His tetralogy Antagony is considered by El Mundo to be one of the best novels of the 20th century. In 2012 it was published in a single book. The first book was translated into English in 2017, and a full translation by Brendan Riley was published as a single book in 2022 by Dalkey Archive Press.

In March 2015 Goytisolo donated 57 boxes of his personal archives to the Biblioteca Nacional de España.

Awards and honors
In 1958 Goytisolo became the inaugural winner of the Premio Biblioteca Breve for his novel Las afueras.

In 1993 Goytisolo won the Premio Nacional de Narrativa for his book Estatua con palomas.

Goytisolo was elected to seat C of the Real Academia Española on 24 March 1994, he took up his seat on 29 January 1995. He took over the seat from Luis Rosales. In 2015 Goytisolo criticized the Spanish government for budgets cuts to the Academia, citing the Academia as fundamental to the Spanish language community worldwide.

In 2013 Goytisolo was awarded the Premio Nacional de las Letras Españolas.

Works
 Las afueras (1958)
 , consisting of: Recuento (1973), Los verdes de mayo hasta el mar (1976), La cólera de Aquiles (1979), Teoría del conocimiento (1981).
 Antagony, trans. Brendan Riley (Dalkey Archive, 2022): Recounting; The Greens of May Down to the Sea; The Wrath of Achilles; Theory of Knowledge

 Estela de fuego que se aleja (1984)
 Estatua con palomas (1993)
 Diario de 360º (2000)
 Liberación (2003)
 Oído atento a los pájaros (2005)
Recounting (Dalkey Archive Press, 2017)

References

1935 births
Living people
20th-century Spanish novelists
21st-century Spanish novelists
Members of the Royal Spanish Academy
Writers from Barcelona
Spanish male novelists
20th-century Spanish male writers
21st-century Spanish male writers